Manuel António Couto Guimarães (born 25 August 1967), commonly known as Nelo, is a retired Portuguese footballer. On the left side of the field, he could appear as either a defender or a midfielder.

Football career
Born in Porto, Nelo grew in local Boavista FC's youth system, then went on to mainly represent its first team as a professional. After an unassuming season at Primeira Liga side S.L. Benfica, he returned to his first club in the 1995 summer, then represented another three teams in quick succession.

Nelo retired in 2007 in amateur football, at the age of almost 40. He earned 11 caps for Portugal, but did not attend any major international tournament – the nation did not qualify for either UEFA Euro 1992 and the 1994 FIFA World Cup.

External links

1967 births
Living people
Footballers from Porto
Portuguese footballers
Association football defenders
Association football midfielders
Primeira Liga players
Liga Portugal 2 players
Segunda Divisão players
Boavista F.C. players
F.C. Felgueiras players
S.C. Farense players
S.L. Benfica footballers
Rio Ave F.C. players
AD Fafe players
Moreirense F.C. players
A.D. Lousada players
F.C. Vizela players
F.C. Tirsense players
Portugal international footballers